Carol Ann Liston  is an Australian historian and academic researcher who specialises in the history of colonial New South Wales from 1788 to 1860. She is associate professor of history at Western Sydney University, in the School of Humanities and Communication Arts. 

Liston has a BA (1973), and a PhD (1980) from the University of Sydney.

In addition to her academic commitments Liston has been president of the Royal Australian Historical Society (RAHS) on three occasions, from 1988 to 1992, in 2002 and from 2014 to 2018. In 2019 she is senior vice president. She has been a councillor of the RAHS since 1983. She is also a member of the Professional Historians Association NSW & ACT.

Liston is also president of the board of the Biographical Database of Australia (BDA), a genealogical project which is transcribing, indexing and uploading biographical records of Aboriginal people, convicts and free settlers.  In July 2018 the online database had nearly 1.6 million records and more are added all the time. 

In her role of president of the RAHS and on behalf of the Hawkesbury Historical Society, Liston gave evidence at the Inquiry into the Windsor Bridge Replacement Project in April 2018.

Awards and recognition
In 2016 Liston received the Annual History Citation from the History Council of NSW in recognition of her lifelong contributions to history and heritage, including to community and local history organisations.

Liston was made an Officer of the Order of Australia (AO) in the 2017 Australia Day Honours for "distinguished service to the preservation and documentation of Australian history and heritage, to professional societies, and to education as a teacher and mentor".

Her contribution to the Royal Australian Historical Society has been recognised with the award of fellow.

Works

References 

Living people
Australian historians
Australian women writers
University of Sydney alumni
Academic staff of Western Sydney University
Year of birth missing (living people)
Officers of the Order of Australia